Mu Yongfeng (born 19 September 1983) is a Chinese trampoline gymnast. He represented China at the 2004 Summer Olympics in Athens, Greece in the men's trampoline event. He finished in 10th place in the qualification round.

References

External links 
 

1983 births
Living people
Place of birth missing (living people)
Chinese male trampolinists
Olympic gymnasts of China
Gymnasts at the 2004 Summer Olympics
21st-century Chinese people